Anton Bourguignon von Baumberg (born in Heřmanův Městec, Austrian Empire, 8 June 1808 – 28 May 1879 in Pula, Austro-Hungarian Empire) was an Austro-Hungarian admiral.

Biography
Bourguignon von Baumberg started his career in the navy in 1825, and, in 1857, he was ranked as a commander. He remained at this rank until the year 1859. In 1864, he was ranked as first admiral of Pula, where he stayed until his death. Two years after his admiral ranking, he was assigned as the main guardian of Pula's military structures. He was in charge of organizing Pula's arsenal, which helped to strengthen the Austrian Empire naval fleet before the Third Italian War of Independence in 1866. At that time, the Italian fleet had been defeated. Emperor Franz Joseph I of Austria promoted him from the highest-ranking Austrian lieutenant to admiral in 1875. He is buried in the navy graveyard in Pula.

Fort Monsival, a fort in Pula, was renamed Fort Bourguignon in 1869 in his honor.

References
 Istrian encyclopedia - Bourguignon von Baumberg, Anton

Austro-Hungarian admirals
1808 births
1879 deaths